Defence Nuclear Material within the UK is defined as:
 Nuclear weapons (warheads)
 Special Nuclear Materials (SNM)
 New and used reactor fuel from Royal Navy submarines.

Nuclear materials